Foel Boeth is the twin top of Gallt y Daren in the southern half of the Snowdonia National Park in Gwynedd, North Wales, and forms part of the Arenig mountain range. Its parent peak is Moel Llyfnant.

The peak is often known as Foel Boeth, however the Nuttall list includes both the twin tops resulting in the higher top being called Gallt y Daren and the lower top called Foel Boeth.

The summit is grassy and is marked by a small pile of stones.

References

Nuttalls
Mountains and hills of Snowdonia
Llanuwchllyn
Mountains and hills of Gwynedd
Trawsfynydd